Jayan Naduvathazhath (born Jayakumar Naduvathazhath) is an Indian film maker and screenwriter who works in Malayalam cinema.
Jayan's entry into mainstream film industry was as the co-writer of the movie Al Mallu. His web series Christopher and Philucifer aired on Kerala Vision was featured in the list of top 12 highly recommended Malayalam web series by Film Companion. 28, a feature film written and directed by Naduvathazhath won an 'Honourable Mention' award at the 7th Art International Independent Film Festival. 'Sanjay on call' ,second movie written and directed by Jayan also won several International film awards including Indo French Film Festival, Sweden Film Festival, MADFA etc.

Filmography

References

External links

Year of birth missing (living people)
Living people
21st-century Indian film directors
Malayalam screenwriters